Kerrie Meares (born 4 September 1982, in Blackwater) is an Australian professional racing cyclist. She is the older sister of Olympic Champion Anna Meares.

In 2002 and after winning 2 x Commonwealth Games Gold Medals in Manchester, Meares was awarded the Queensland Sportswoman of the Year. Later that year, she was awarded the Peter Lacey award,  an award bestowed on Queensland Academy of Sport athletes who have achieved great international success as well as being an ambassador for their sport. Meares went on to win further medals at the 2006 Commonwealth Games in both the 500m Time Trial and Match Sprint in Melbourne, but retired before a third consecutive games in Delhi, India.

As a Junior athlete, Meares was extremely successful breaking numerous State and National records in Sprint discipline events. She was a contender for the 2004 Olympic team, but pulled out from competition due to nagging back injuries, suffered during numerous crashes that occurred during competitions earlier that year.

Meares retired from professional track cycling in 2007 and married former compatriot and sportswoman Emily Rosemond. Post retirement from cycling, Kerrie and her wife Emily started the Track Cycling Academy based in Brisbane and online.

Honours 

2002 Australian Female Track Cyclist of the Year
2002 Queensland Sportswoman of the Year
2002 Peter Lacey Award 
1999-2001 Multiplex Women's Sport Rising Star Scholarship Award
1997, 2000, 2001 Morning Bulletin / Frenchville Sports Club Junior Sports Star of the Year
2000 Australian Junior Women's Track Cyclist of the Year
1998 Coca-Cola Junior Sports Star of the Year

Career highlights

1999
2nd 500m TT, World Track Championships - Junior
3rd Scratch Race, Oceania Games, Sydney
2000
1st 500m TT, World Track Championships - Junior
2002
3rd 500m TT, World Track Championships, Copenhagen
2nd Sprint, World Track Championships, Copenhagen
1st Team Sprint, Sydney
1st 500m TT, Commonwealth Games, Manchester
1st Sprint, Commonwealth Games, Manchester
2003
2nd Keirin, Sydney
2004
1st 500m TT, Oceania Games, Melbourne
1st Sprint, Oceania Games, Melbourne
1st Keirin, Oceania Games, Melbourne
2005
2nd 500m TT, Australian National Track Championships, Adelaide
2nd Sprint, Australian National Track Championships, Adelaide
3rd Keirin, Australian National Track Championships, Adelaide
3rd Sprint, Oceania Games, Wanganui
2nd 500m TT, Oceania Games, Wanganui
1st Keirin, Oceania Games, Wanganui
2006
2nd 500m TT, Australian National Track Championships, Adelaide
1st Team Sprint, Australian National Track Championships, Adelaide
2nd Sprint, Australian National Track Championships, Adelaide
1st Keirin, Australian National Track Championships, Adelaide
3rd 500m TT, Commonwealth Games, Melbourne
3rd Sprint, Commonwealth Games, Melbourne
1st Team Sprint, Sydney
2nd 500m TT, Oceania Games, Melbourne
1st Sprint, Oceania Games, Melbourne
1st Keirin, Oceania Games, Melbourne
2007
1st Team Sprint, Australian National Track Championships, Sydney
1st Sprint, Australian National Track Championships, Sydney
2nd Sprint, Oceania Cycling Championships, Invercargill
1st Team Sprint, Oceania Cycling Championships, Invercargill
2nd Team Sprint, Sydney
2008
3rd Team Sprint, Los Angeles
2009
1st Keirin, Australian National Track Championships, Adelaide

Personal life 
Kerrie Meares grew up close to Rockhampton in a suburb called Gracemere. Kerrie and Olympic sister Anna Meares now have streets named after them.

Following retirement from cycling, via the Adelaide Advertiser Kerrie announced her marriage to Olympic speed-skater Emily Rosemond in 2015.

References

External links

LinkedIn profile

https://www.sbs.com.au/cyclingcentral/article/2018/CFS/KerrieMeares 
https://web.archive.org/web/20150228231402/http://www.qasport.qld.gov.au/media-publications/news/2014-12-11-peter-lacey-award.html

1982 births
Living people
Australian Institute of Sport cyclists
Australian female cyclists
Australian track cyclists
Commonwealth Games gold medallists for Australia
Commonwealth Games bronze medallists for Australia
Cyclists at the 2002 Commonwealth Games
Cyclists at the 2006 Commonwealth Games
Sportswomen from Queensland
Commonwealth Games medallists in cycling
Cyclists from Queensland
Medallists at the 2002 Commonwealth Games
Medallists at the 2006 Commonwealth Games